The Meadow River Lumber Company, which operated in Rainelle, West Virginia from 1906 to 1975, was the largest hardwood sawmill in the world.  It had three  bandsaws under one roof.  In 1928, during peak production, its 500 employees produced 31 million board feet (73 thousand cubic meters) of lumber, cutting  of virgin timber a year.

History
In 1903, the brothers Thomas and John Raine of Ironton, Ohio and later Empire, Pennsylvania joined a lumber firm operating near Evenwood in Randolph County, West Virginia.  Later, in 1906, they began purchasing  of land, containing one of the last large stands of virgin hardwood in the United States, mostly on the Meadow River drainage, in western Greenbrier County, West Virginia.  Being  to the nearest railroad mainline, they first formed the Sewell Valley Railroad Company to construct a spur line, which eventually evolved into the Meadow River Railroad.  This spur was initially used to haul building materials into the wilderness area, and eventually to haul their products out to market.   Mill construction began in 1909, and the first board was sawed in September, 1910.  Ultimately the mill contained three  bandsaws under one roof, making it the largest hardwood sawmill.

The plant and railroad operated several Shay locomotives, one of which was acquired by the Cass Scenic Railroad in 1964, and has since fallen into disrepair.

The plant included a planing mill with the capacity of turning out a million feet (2,360,000 cubic meters) of flooring, ceiling, siding and trim pieces a year.  Six large kilns dried lumber for use in the planing mill.

In 1913,the firm created the nearby town of Rainelle.  Company-owned houses there were plastered and papered inside, painted white outside, and designed for sanitation, with modern plumbing and electricity. Each had a yard and a garden space surrounding it.

The original mill building was destroyed by fire in 1924.  The employees were set to work building a new one, which was operational by March of the following year.

Meadow River lumber began the process called clearcutting in 1939.

Major products included flooring, hardwood shoe heels, furniture, and later moldings and trim.  By the time the mill ceased operation, it was the world's largest producer of women's hardwood shoe heels and flooring.  It was also the last of the Eastern United States' large independent wood producers.

The business was sold to Georgia-Pacific Corporation in 1970, and the mill was subsequently torn down in 1975.

References

External links

Shay Engine #7, now owned by the Cass Scenic Railroad

History of West Virginia
Defunct forest products companies of the United States
Greenbrier County, West Virginia
Historic American Engineering Record in West Virginia
Defunct manufacturing companies based in West Virginia